The 2021–22 Illinois Fighting Illini women's basketball team represented the University of Illinois during the 2021–22 NCAA Division I women's basketball season. The Fighting Illini, led by fifth-year head coach Nancy Fahey, played their home games at State Farm Center as members of the Big Ten Conference. 

They finished the season 7–20, 1–13 in Big Ten play to finish in fourteenth place. As the fourteenth seed in the Big Ten women's tournament, they defeated eleventh seed Wisconsin in the First Round before losing to sixth seed Nebraska in the Second Round.  They were not invited to the NCAA tournament or the WNIT.

Previous season

Due to the COVID-19 pandemic in the United States, the Illini played fewer non-conference games than in previous seasons; three games were originally postponed and later canceled due to the pandemic. They finished the season 5–18, 2–16 in Big Ten play to finish in thirteenth place. They lost in the second round of the Big Ten women's tournament to Northwestern. Their first round win against Wisconsin was the first Big Ten tournament victory in coach Fahey's tenure at Illinois.

Roster

Schedule
Source:

|-
!colspan="6" style=| Regular season

|-
!colspan="6" style=| Big Ten Women's Tournament

Rankings

The Coaches Poll did not release a Week 2 poll and the AP Poll did not release a poll after the NCAA Tournament.

References

Illinois Fighting Illini women's basketball seasons
Illinois
Illinois Fighting Illini women's basketball
Illinois Fighting Illini women's basketball